Solidarity with Ukraine is an unofficial title often given to the series of Banksy street murals that appeared in Ukraine in November 2022.

Background
All of the murals in the series portray the reality of war and the suffering of the Ukrainian people. One image of a woman in a bathrobe wearing a gas mask was removed from the wall, believed to be in an attempt to sell and profit from Banksy's artwork. Ukrainian media reported that the perpetrator could face up to 12 years in jail for the crime.

Artwork
In total, Banksy was responsible for seven different artworks in the nation. Children of War was one of the more notable artworks, depicting two children using a military blockade as a seesaw.

References

 Works by Banksy